Ernest James Peppiatt (27 July 1917 – 1979) was a male weightlifter who competed for England. He competed in the men's middleweight event at the 1948 Summer Olympics. He also represented England in the -75 kg division at the 1950 British Empire Games in Auckland, New Zealand.

References

1917 births
1979 deaths
English male weightlifters
Weightlifters at the 1950 British Empire Games
Olympic weightlifters of Great Britain
Weightlifters at the 1948 Summer Olympics
Sportspeople from London
Commonwealth Games competitors for England